I'm No Angel is a 1933 film starring Mae West and Cary Grant, also a song sung by West in the film

I'm No Angel may also refer to:

Music
 I'm No Angel (album), a 1987 album by the Gregg Allman Band
  I'm No Angel, a 1993 album by Carole Davis
 "I'm No Angel" (Bill Medley song), a 1982 song
 "I'm No Angel" (Marcella Detroit song), a 1994 song
 "I'm No Angel", a song by Dido from her 1999 album No Angel
 "I'm No Angel", a song by Heather Nova from her 2001 album South

Other
 Tenshi Ja Nai!!, (I'm No Angel), manga by Takako Shigematsu
 I'm No Angel: From Victoria's Secret Model to Role Model, an autobiography written by former runway model Kylie Bisutti
 "I'm No Angel", an episode from Supernatural

See also
 I'm Not an Angel (disambiguation)
 No Angel (disambiguation)